Offlumer See is a lake in Kreis Steinfurt, North Rhine-Westphalia, Germany. At an elevation of 46 m, its surface area is 0.5 km².

Lakes of North Rhine-Westphalia